The AN/SPG-53 was a United States Navy Gun Fire-control radar (International Telecommunication Union classification: radiolocation land station in the radiolocation service), used in conjunction with the Mark 68 gun fire-control system. 

It was used with the 5"/54 caliber Mark 42 gun system aboard s,  and s and s of the US Navy, as well as Australian s and Spanish s.

See also
List of radars

References

External links
GlobalSecurity.org
Mk 68 GFCS

Sea radars
Military electronics of the United States
Military equipment introduced in the 1950s